Rose Beaudet (born Eliza Lang; 1862–1947) was an American actress and opera singer of the late 19th and early 20th century who regularly appeared in musical theatre.

She was born as Eliza Lang, the daughter of Councilman Lewis H. Lang (1836-1912) of Stockton near San Francisco, and his wife Mary Ann Lang (1848 -1878). She married S. Arlant Edwards on 15 January 1891, but had divorced him by 1902. She appeared with the C. D. Willard Company in 1903.

A mezzo-soprano, Beaudet's appearances on Broadway included Eva in The Beggar Student at the Casino Theatre (1883 - 1884), Amorita at the Casino Theatre (1885), Captain Delauney in Erminie at the Casino Theatre (1886), a role played in the original London production by Kate Everleigh,  The Kitchen Belle (1889), Mrs St Mirim in  Miss Innocence Abroad at the Bijou Theatre (1894), Catherine in Lost, Strayed or Stolen  at the Fifth Avenue Theatre (1896), All on Account of Eliza at the Garrick Theatre and Wallack's Theatre (1900 - 1901), The Cardinal at the Garden Theatre (1902), Mrs Jefferson Briscoe in  The County Chairman  at Wallack's Theatre (1903 - 1904), Marcie Brook in Miss Jack  at the Herald Square Theatre (1911), and Mrs Kennion in The Younger Generation and in Half an Hour  at the Lyceum Theatre (1913).

She died in 1947 and is buried in Stockton Rural Cemetery with her father, mother and sister.

References

1862 births
1947 deaths
American stage actresses
American operatic mezzo-sopranos
19th-century American actresses
20th-century American actresses
People from Stockton, California
Singers from California
Classical musicians from California